Lia Grimanis (born December 12, 1971) is a Canadian Charity founder and CEO, Guinness World Record Holding Strongwoman and adventurer . She is the founder of Up With Women, an organization dedicated to helping homeless and at-risk women to rebuild their lives.

Up With Women
Grimanis founded the organization to give women and children inspiration and strategies for rebuilding their lives after homelessness. Grimanis was driven to establish Up With Women because of her time spent as a homeless teenager. Up With Women's mission: Success Belongs to Everybody

Up With Women works to:
 Provide advanced career and life-building coaching and education for recently homeless and at-risk  women.
 Provide leadership mentoring for formerly homeless children to help them to become leaders in their communities. Up With Women Child Advocates participate in a variety of projects. One of the more notable activities is to create a community action project and creatively give back to the community.
 Raise public awareness about women's homelessness, through community outreach and media relations. Up With Women's media work aims to share positive stories about formerly homeless women and children who have rebuilt their lives. The media work also works to highlight key issues surrounding women's and family homelessness, while engaging the public to support the cause of ending homelessness, poverty and violence against women.

Biography

Grimanis has almost 25 years of experience as a successful businesswoman and entrepreneur.

On a civic level, she has served on Toronto mayor David Miller's communications advisory team, with a special focus on the "Opportunity for All" platform. She served as a media strategist and she wrote the Opportunity for All platform speech.

Financial Post Magazine listed her as one of Canada's 100 Most Powerful women, and Chatelaine named her one of the 2012 Women of the Year. The global businesswomen's organization the International Alliance of Women recognized Grimanis as one of 50 women around the world making a notable impact on the economic empowerment of women, and she was named Volunteer of the Year by Flare Magazine. Grimanis has also been nominated as one of Canada's Top 40 Under 40.

Grimanis holds a Guinness World Record for strength, the Heaviest Vehicle Pulled in High Heels (14,520 lbs) She also held another Guinness World Record for strength, the Heaviest Vehicle Pulled 100 ft by a Woman (17,820 lbs) (from 2013 to 2018). She uses these feats of strength to send a message to women survivors of violence, poverty and homelessness that we're stronger than we think we are.

Grimanis has been involved in a variety of community engagements, outside of Up With Women. She is a co-founder of Toronto-based Social Venture Partners, an organization that blends the power of business with the passion of philanthropy to assist grass roots organizations that are focused on poverty reduction. She sits on the advisory board of Future Possibilities for Kids, and has also worked in partnership with the United Way, the Canadian Women's Foundation and Raising the Roof. She is also a founder of Muff Scouts, an international adventure sport organization for lesbian, bisexual and transgender women.

Grimanis has frequently appeared in the media, having had news and story features appear on NBC morning news program Today, Inc Magazine, CNN Money, Global, CTV, CBC Television, Citytv, More Magazine, the Toronto Star and the Toronto Sun. She focuses in on the media to help disseminate the positive stories of women and children coming out of homelessness, while raising awareness about the issues today.

She is frequently asked to give speeches to such diverse groups as business people, women's groups, sales professionals, community service providers, and government workers.

Awards
 Named one of Canada's 100 Most Powerful Women 
 Two time Guinness World Record holder: 
 Heaviest Vehicle Pulled 100 ft by a Woman
 Heaviest Vehicle Pulled in High Heels
 Chatelaine Woman of the Year
  International Alliance of Women World of Difference global Unsung Heroine
 Flare Volunteer of the Year
 Amazing Woman's Day Business Trailblazer

References

External links
 Up With Women

1971 births
Businesspeople from Toronto
Canadian humanitarians
Women humanitarians
Canadian women in business
Living people
Canadian LGBT businesspeople
Canadian LGBT sportspeople
Lesbian sportswomen
Sportspeople from Toronto